In Ohio, State Route 277 may refer to:
Interstate 277 in Ohio, the only Ohio highway numbered 277 since about 1962
Ohio State Route 277 (1930s-1960s), now SR 207